RaiPlay is the multimedia portal owned by the Italian national broadcaster RAI replacing Rai.tv since 12 September 2016. It is for watching popular Italian shows such as 'Inspector Montalbano', 'Don Matteo' and many more.

Login and registration, which are free, are required to watch on demand content on RaiPlay. Initially, access has been required only for the app, but since 21 August 2017, it is also required when using the browser. Rai, owner of RaiPlay, released a new update where RaiPlay can only be accessed when in Italy.

RaiPlay also has Rai1/Rai2/RaiYoyo for kids shows and programmes, with the new update including removals of adult-related shows such as with car crashes, war, blood and nudity. More children programmes have also been added.

RaiPlay has accounts on the main social media networks (Facebook, Twitter, Instagram) where the latest content and live streaming is shared. The site is also available for smartphones with the dedicated app downloadable from Microsoft Store, Google Play and App Store. Commercials are managed by Rai Pubblicità, a Rai company.

History 
RaiPlay was created on 9 January 2007 as Rai.tv and operated by Rai Net (now Rai). The website allowed viewers to watch and listen to programs entirely or partially produced by Rai. The availability of programs was subject to copyright. The website also hosted exclusive content including interviews, extras, specials and blogs. A podcasting service was also made available from RaiPlay. Until January 2009, the app used by the site to play files had been Windows Media Player 11. Since February 2009, Rai.tv used Silverlight for video streaming while choosing Silverlight or RealPlayer for audio content (of radio channels). Microsoft Silverlight limited the availability of live video streaming exclusively to Microsoft users.

From 2007 to 2014 many videos have been available on the Rai's Youtube channel, but in 2014 the broadcaster decided not to renew the partnership with the famous web site, removing 150 000 videos in a 9 year period. The economic loss due to this decision has been estimated at €1,5 million.

On 12 September 2016, Rai.tv became RaiPlay, renewing its graphics and functions but not including the live streaming or radio content. RaiPlay has been available on smart TVs since December 2016.

Since 1 June 2017, during the airing of the second season of Non uccidere, all episodes of new seasons belonging to Rai series or purchased from other broadcasters were made available online via RaiPlay Anteprima.

On 30 October 2019 a huge update was released, making the app look more similar to other services like Netflix or Amazon Prime Video. On 5 November of the same year, the first original show of the service, Viva RaiPlay!, was released. This program also aired on Rai 1 until 8 November. On 13 November, it became a RaiPlay exclusive.

Contents 
On the home page are shown news or exclusive content, collections of programs divided in sections which will be customized if logging on with a RaiPlay account.

On the sidebar (which can be opened by clicking on the dedicated button) are available these sections: 

 Guida TV (TV guide) / Replay, with the list of channels and programs in chronological order which integrate the Replay function allowing to re-watch a program already aired;
 Dirette (Live TV's), where users can watch in live streaming the TV channels of Rai;
 Programmi (Shows), with a list of programs organized in alphabetical order and divided in sections;
 Ultimi visti (Last shown), I miei preferiti (My favourites) and Guarda dopo (Watch later), available only after the required register or login.

References

External links 
 
 Rai (Wikipedia article)
 
 Rai Pubblicità

Television in Italy
Video on demand services
Play